Esra Yıldız (born 1997) is a Turkish amateur boxer who won a bronze medal in the lightweight division at the 2016 European Championships. She was named as a competitor for the 2020 Summer Olympics.

Personal life
Yıldız was born in Nevşehir, Turkey in 1997. After completing her high school education at Altınyıldız College in Nevşehir in 2015, she entered Nevşehir Hacı Bektaş Veli University to study Physical Education and Sport, graduating in 2019.

Amateur boxing career
Yıldız started boxing at Nevşehir Gençlik Sports Club in 2010. In 2012, she participated in Turkey's Championships held in Kayseri. She became champion in the 57 kg division, and was named the "Most Hyped Boxer". Following her victory she was admitted to Turkey's national team.

She debuted internationally at the 2012 European Cadets and Juniors Boxing Championships in Władysławowo, Poland, and won the bronze medal n the -57 kg division. In June 2013, she took part at the VII EUBC European Union Women Elite Youth and Junior Boxing Championships 2013 in Keszthely, Hungary, and captured the gold medal in the junior 60 kg division. The same year, she took the silver medal in the junior 60 kg event at the AIBA Women’s Junior/Youth World Boxing Championships held in Albena, Bulgaria.

Yıldız participated at the 2014 Summer Youth Olympics in Nanjing, China. She won the silver medal in the youth lightweight event at the 2014 AIBA Youth World Boxing Championships in Sofia in Bulgaria. She took part at the 2016 AIBA Women's World Boxing Championships in Astana, Kazakhstan. At the 2016 EUBC Women’s Boxing Championships in  Sofia, Bulgaria, she won the bronze medal. She competed in the featherweight (54-57 kg) division at the 2018 AIBA Women's World Boxing Championships in New Delhi, India. In 2019, she was a finalist at the  Balkan Boxing Championships. Yıldız won the bronze medal at the 2020 European Boxing Olympic Qualification Tournament in London. She was named as a competitor for the 2020 Summer Olympics.

Yıldız is a member of Fenerbahçe Boxing, where she is coached by Nedim Baba.

References

1997 births
Living people
Sportspeople from Nevşehir
Turkish women boxers
Lightweight boxers
Fenerbahçe boxers
Boxers at the 2014 Summer Youth Olympics
Boxers at the 2020 Summer Olympics
Olympic boxers of Turkey
21st-century Turkish sportswomen
20th-century Turkish sportswomen